Mike Faulkerson Dulaney (born September 9, 1970 in Kingsport, TN) is a former American football fullback in the National Football League for the Chicago Bears and Carolina Panthers. He played college football at North Carolina and before attended Dobyns-Bennett High School.

College career
He played college football at North Carolina. He was a 4-year letterman and 3-year starter for the Tarheels. In 1992, he served as a team captain and ended his senior season as part of a team that won the 1993 Peach Bowl over Miss St. Georgia Dome Atlanta, GA.

Professional career
In 1996, he led the Bears in special teams tackles with 17 solo tackles and 5 assisted tackles with 2 caused fumbles. He was a 1996 Pro Bowl nominee as a special teams player.

He is credited with one preseason touchdown (against the Pittsburgh Steelers) and one in the regular season touchdown (versus the Detroit Lions).

External links
NFL stats at databasefootball.com
College football stats at totalfootball.com
Arena Football stats at arenafan.com

1970 births
Living people
American football fullbacks
Chicago Bears players
Carolina Panthers players